Jaromir Radke (born 28 May 1969) is a Polish speed skater. He competed at the 1992 Winter Olympics and the 1994 Winter Olympics.

References

1969 births
Living people
Polish male speed skaters
Olympic speed skaters of Poland
Speed skaters at the 1992 Winter Olympics
Speed skaters at the 1994 Winter Olympics
People from Tomaszów Mazowiecki